Spyros Theodorou (born 25 June 1952) is a Greek alpine skier. He competed at the 1972 Winter Olympics and the 1976 Winter Olympics.

References

External links
 

1952 births
Living people
Greek male alpine skiers
Olympic alpine skiers of Greece
Alpine skiers at the 1972 Winter Olympics
Alpine skiers at the 1976 Winter Olympics
Place of birth missing (living people)